Charles Wilfred Valentine (16 August 1879 – 26 May 1964) was a British educationalist and psychologist.

He was a student at Cambridge University and there befriended William Gidley Emmett with whom he later co-wrote a book, The Reliability of Examinations in 1932, which questioned the value of traditional testing and helped create a foundation for alternative test methods.

Valentine was President of the British Psychology Society in 1947-48 and became an Honorary Fellow of the Society in 1958.

Bibliography 
 Dreams and the Unconscious an Introduction to the Study of Psycho-analysis (2010), first published in 1922 by Macmillan.
An Introduction to Experimental Psychology in Relation to Education, (2009), BiblioBazaar, first published in 1916 by Warwick & Yor Inc.The Normal child and some of his abnormalities (1963), Pelican Books.Experimental Psychology of Beauty (1962), Methuen.Parents and children: A first book on the psychology of child development and training (1955)The Difficult Child and the Problem of Discipline, (1947), Methuen.The human factor in the army;: Some applications of psychology to training, selection, morale and discipline (1945)Principles of army instruction: with special reference to elementary weapon training (1943)The Psychology of Early Childhood. A study of mental development in the first years of life (1942), Methuen.Latin: its place and value in education'', (1935)

References 

 A. D. Lovie and P. Lovie ODNB http://www.oxforddnb.com/view/article/63841
 http://onlinelibrary.wiley.com/doi/10.1111/j.2044-8295.1964.tb00923.x/abstract obituary by Tom Pear
 http://onlinelibrary.wiley.com/doi/10.1111/j.2044-8279.1964.tb00631.x/abstract obituary by Cyril Burt

1879 births
1964 deaths
Presidents of the British Psychological Society
People educated at Preston Grammar School